Esra Kızıldoğan (born 1980) is a Turkish actress. Having portrayed Müge in the series Sefirin Kızı from 2019 to 2021, she plays the role of Altun Jan Khatun in the historical drama series Alparslan: Büyük Selçuklu.

Life and career 
Kızıldoğan graduated with a degree in theatre studies from Istanbul University State Conservatory in 2001 and earned her master's degree in acting from Bahçeşehir University. After appearing on stage for various years, she made her television debut in 2004 with a role in the series Kadir Şinas. She continued her career with roles in the series Masum, Sultan, Leyla ile Mecnun, Bu Kalp Seni Unutur mu?, Zoraki Başkan, and Beyaz Gelincik. Her breakthrough came with her portrayal of Müge in Sefirin Kızı (2019–2021). In 2021, she was cast as Altun Jan Khatun in the historical drama series Alparslan: Büyük Selçuklu. She has continued her career on stage, with her latest role being in the adaptation of Talk about the Passion by Graham Farrow.

Theatre 
 Wit : Margaret Edson – Kent Oyuncuları – 1999
 Proof : David Auburn – Kent Oyuncuları – 2001
 The Blue Room : David Hare – Kent Oyuncuları – 2003
 Othello : William Shakespeare – Oyun Workshop – 2004
 The Other Death of Jeanne D'Arc : Stefan Tsanev – Oyun Workshop – 2006
 Macbeth : William Shakespeare – Oyun Workshop – 2010
 Hamlet : William Shakespeare – Moda Stage – 2013
 Talk about the Passion : Graham Farrow – Duru Theatre – 2019

Filmography

Film 
 Hacivat Karagöz Neden Öldürüldü (2006)

TV series 
 Kadir Şinas (2004)
 Beyaz Gelincik (2005)
 Zoraki Başkan (2009)
 Bu Kalp Seni Unutur mu? (2010)
 Leyla ile Mecnun (2011)
 Sultan (2012)
 Hayat Şarkısı (2016)
 Bir Deli Sevda (2016)
 Sevdanın Bahçesi (2017)
 Masum (2017)
 Bozkır (2018–2019)
 Sefirin Kızı (2019–2021)
 Alparslan: Büyük Selçuklu (2021–)

Awards 
 2004: Sadri Alışık Theatre Awards, Best Supporting Actress – Othello

References

External links 
 
 

1980 births
Turkish film actresses
Turkish stage actresses
Turkish television actresses
Living people